"This Mess" is the first single released by Australian band Wolf & Cub, from their debut album Vessels. The song was Single of the Week on iTunes for the first week of August in 2006.

Track listing

CD

BAD 2715CD 
1. "This Mess" - 3:52 
2. "The Death Rattle Shakes" - 4:29 
3. "Chameleon and the Snakes" - 3:42

7"

AD 2715 
1. "This Mess" - 3:52 
2. "The Death Rattle Shakes" - 4:29

iTunes

1. "This Mess" (single edit) - 3:06

Video

For their first music video, Wolf & Cub used kaleidoscopic editing techniques to complement their psychedelic sound. Also known as reflection symmetry, the video alludes to their use of dual drummers visually because the imagery is in doubles.

2007 songs
4AD singles